The 2014–15 SMU Mustangs women's basketball team will represent Southern Methodist University in the 2014–15 NCAA Division I women's basketball season. The Mustangs will play their home games at Moody Coliseum. The 2014–15 season will be the second season the Mustangs will participate in the American Athletic Conference. The Mustangs were coached by 24th year head coach Rhonda Rompola. They finished the season 7–23, 3–15 in AAC play to finish in tenth place. They lost in the first round in the American Athletic women's tournament to Memphis.

Media
All Pony Express games will air on KAAM. Before conference season home games will be streamed on Pony Up TV. Conference home games will rotate between ESPN3, AAC Digital, and Pony Up TV. Road games will typically be streamed on the opponents website, though conference road games could also appear on ESPN3 or AAC Digital.

2014–15 Roster

Schedule and results

|-
!colspan=12 style="background:#C60C30; color:#0039A6;"| Regular Season

|-
!colspan=12 style="background:#0039A6;"| 2015 AAC Tournament

|-

See also
2014–15 SMU Mustangs men's basketball team
SMU Mustangs women's basketball

References

External links
SMU Mustangs women's basketball official website 

SMU Mustangs women's basketball seasons
SMU